Kanalizasyon is a 2009 Turkish comedy film directed by Alper Mestçi.

Plot
İmdat is a poor, uneducated, working class window cleaner who has migrated to the big city. As he cleans the windows of the private TV channel Kanal I, the president of the channel, Berk, discovers that İmdat has an uncanny ability to sense what program will yield the best ratings and what is likely to be panned by audiences, thus Berk begins milking İmdat's unique ability to score ratings. Soon İmdat finds himself replacing the president and leading the TV channel. He goes on to produce some truly tasteless and exploitative programs that enjoy massive ratings, eventually becoming part of the dirty media games himself.

Cast
 Okan Bayülgen as İmdat
 Hakan Yılmaz as Berk
 Aslıhan Gürbüz as Nazlı
 Serhat Özcan as Atilla
 Erol Günaydın
 Rasim Öztekin

References

External links
  (Turkish)
 
 

2009 films
2009 comedy films
Films set in Turkey
Turkish comedy films